Marvin, later called Marvin & Family (and Marvin and Staff on Sundays in October 2020), is a daily newspaper comic strip created by cartoonist Tom Armstrong and distributed in the U.S. by Hearst's King Features Syndicate. Debuting in 1982, it revolves around the life and times of a young baby boy named Marvin, along with his parents, Jeff and Jenny Miller, and their dog Bitsy. In 1989, CBS aired a special, "Marvin, Baby of the Year."

Publication history
Cartoonist Tom Armstrong debuted the seven-days-weekly comic strip Marvin on Sunday, August 1, 1982. Originally distributed by North America Syndicate, it later went through Hearst's King Features Syndicate. (There was an earlier strip named Marvin, which was created by Pat Moran and syndicated in 1973.) The strip revolves around the life and times of a young baby boy named Marvin, along with his parents, Jeff and Jenny Miller, and their dog Bitsy.

On March 10, 1989, CBS aired a half-hour Animated special, Marvin, Baby of the Year. It has never been released on home video.

While the strip's characters do not age, Marvin is identified as less than 1 year old in the December 16, 1999 strip, and identified as a 2-year-old on the official website as of May 2015. The location is not explicitly defined, other than that in one strip Marvin states that he is in Indiana. However, in another strip, his mother is reading The Sacramento Bee. In 2012, in honor of the strip's 30th anniversary, it spoofed Back to the Future where baby Marvin meets himself as a full-grown man. The 30-something Marvin tells his baby self what awaits for him.

Marvin does not speak, save for occasional crying, but he can be fully understood through thinking. He can communicate with other babies through his thoughts, but not adults or anyone capable of speaking on their own. Most of the humor comes from Marvin's very limited understanding of the world due to his early development. For example, he wonders about an approaching winter by thinking to himself "Why is now the time when people put their clothes on..." then looking out the window at a tree with shedding leaves "...And trees take theirs off".

A few flashback episodes showed Marvin as an unborn fetus, in imitation of Eggbert, a strip by LAF.

Creator Tom Armstrong has made changes to the strip's character designs. In one e-mail to a fan Armstrong explains why he made these changes.

Other major characters include Megan, Marvin's cousin; Janet, who is Megan's mother and Jenny's sister; Ming Ming, Janet's adopted daughter from China; Bea and Roy, Marvin's maternal grandparents; and Doris, Marvin's paternal grandmother. Family characters who have not yet been seen are Marvin's paternal grandfather or Megan's father (the strip indicates Megan's parents are divorced). Minor characters have included Bea and Roy's toy schnauzer named Junior; Roy's friend Bernie; and Marvin's friends Jordan, Warren (who is a genius, with a 174 IQ), Kyle, Gerald and Will, a child prodigy who spelled "prodigy" at five months.  Jeff has a macho friend, Ted. Jordan has a girlfriend Shillina. Marvin's goldfish are Finn and Gill. As of 2022 Jordan has a baby sister Lici.

Prior to 2013 the strip's name was simply Marvin.

Events
Bea and Roy Arnold lost their retirement savings in the 2008 recession and had to move in with Jeff and Jenny; Janet did not have enough room. As of 2021 the grandparents are no longer living with the family.

In 2010, the Millers got new neighbors, the Purfects, who are so perfect they make the Millers feel inadequate. Rodney Purfect has a PhD and is a company president, has won the Heisman Trophy and climbed Mount Kilimanjaro. He is six feet five inches tall and very manly. Barbie Purfect is a blonde housewife who attended cooking school in Paris, was a cheerleader, class president and sorority president. Rodney Purfect II is two and a half years old but reads at a third grade level, performed his piano composition for Queen Elizabeth II and was potty trained at 6 months.  He also has blond hair.

In 2005, Marvin guest starred in the comic strip Blondie for its 75th anniversary.

In 2019, Jeff's mother was kicked out of her retirement home and moved in with the family.

References

External links
King Features
The Washington Post

Further reading
Strickler, Dave. Syndicated Comic Strips and Artists, 1924-1995: The Complete Index. Cambria, California: Comics Access, 1995. 

American comic strips
1982 comics debuts
Child characters in comics
Male characters in comics
Gag-a-day comics
Comics set in the United States
Comics characters introduced in 1982